Nanoviridae is a family of viruses. Plants serve as natural hosts. There are currently 12 species in this family, divided among 2 genera and one unassigned species. Diseases associated with this family include: stunting. Their name is derived from the Greek word νᾶνος (nanos; dwarf), because of their small genome and their stunting effect on infected plants.

Taxonomy
The recognized genera are:
 Babuvirus
 Nanovirus

The unassigned species is Coconut foliar decay virus.

Virus structure and genome
Viruses in the family Nanoviridae are non-enveloped, with icosahedral and round geometries, and T=1 symmetry. The diameter is around 18-19 nm.

The genome is composed of a multiple segments of single stranded circular DNA  each ~1 kilobase in length (about 81 kb in total length). There between 6 and 11 circular segments depending on the genus. The segments each encode a single protein. There is a putative stem loop structure in the non-coding region of each segment which has a conserved 9-nucleotide sequence at its apex.

Each member has up to 4 segments encoding replication proteins of ~33 kiloDaltons (kDa). The other segments encode products of 10-20 kDa in size and include a coat protein of ~19 kDa and a protein with a retinoblastoma binding motif.

Life cycle
Viral replication is nuclear. Entry into the host cell is achieved by penetration into the host cell. Replication follows the ssDNA rolling circle model. After infection of a host cell, the small DNA molecules that have become encapsidated with the genomic ssDNA act as primers. They bind to complementary regions and help in initiation of DNA synthesis by host polymerases. On completion of synthesis, there will be a double stranded intermediate that is transcribed unidirectionally. Most individual nanovirus particles only encode for a single protein.
DNA-templated transcription is the method of transcription. The virus exits the host cell by nuclear pore export, and tubule-guided viral movement. Plants serve as the natural host. The virus is transmitted via a vector (aphids).

References

External links
 ICTV Report Nanoviridae
 
 Notes on Nanoviridae
 Viralzone: Nanoviridae

 
Virus families